Falling Foss is a waterfall that lies in the north-east section of The North York Moors National Park and is a popular spot for walking.

References

External links

 North York Moors cam

Waterfalls of North Yorkshire